Jacques Henri-Labourdette (1915 – 27 May 2003) was a 20th-century French architect.

1915 births
2003 deaths
Architects from Paris
École des Beaux-Arts alumni
20th-century French architects